= Juan Manuel Ortiz de Rozas =

Argentine diplomat

Ambassador of Argentina to Norway
- In office January 2006 – May 2016
- Preceded by: Orlando Rebagliatti
- Succeeded by: Mónica Dinucci

Ambassador of Argentina to Spain
- In office 1999–2000
- Preceded by: Carlos Pedro Amar
- Succeeded by: Ricardo Laferriere

Personal details
- Born: 17 July 1949 (age 76) La Plata, Buenos Aires, Argentina

Juan Manuel Ortiz de Rozas (born 17 July 1949) is an Argentine diplomat. He is a lawyer, studied law at the Universidad Católica de La Plata. He speaks English, French, Portuguese and Italian. He is married and has three children.
